WVBD (100.7 FM, "West Virginia's Big Daddy") is a radio station broadcasting a classic country music format. Licensed to Fayetteville, West Virginia, United States, the station is currently owned by Summit Media South, Inc. and features programming from AP Radio and Dial Global.

References

External links
 
 

VBD
Classic country radio stations in the United States
Fayette County, West Virginia